Logroño is the capital of the province of La Rioja, situated in northern Spain. Traversed in its northern part by the Ebro River, Logroño has historically been a place of passage, such as the Camino de Santiago. Its borders were disputed  between the Iberian kingdoms of Castille, Navarre and Aragon during the Middle Ages.

The population of the city in 2021 was 150,808 while the metropolitan area included nearly 200,000 inhabitants. The city is a centre of trade of Rioja wine, for which the area is noted, and manufacturing of wood, metal and textile products.

Etymology

Origin of the name 
The origin of this toponym is, as for many other places, unknown. The name Lucronio was first used in a document from 965 where García Sánchez I of Pamplona donated the so-called place to the Monastery of San Millán. In the Fuero of Logroño from 1095 it appeared under the name Logronio, except once when it was called illo Gronio. The most broadly accepted theses seem to be those which indicate it is a late latinization by prefixing the article "lo/illo" to the old toponym Gronio/Gronno, a word of Celtic origin which means the ford or the pass. It is believed that this name was due to the frequent use of this place to cross the Ebro river.

Other historians have proposed alternative theories, such as a possible derivation from Lucus Brun or Lucus Beronius ("Sacred place in the Beronian forest"), but its etymology remains unknown.

Titles 
John II of Castile granted it the title of "City" on 7 February 1431 in Palencia and ratified it on  20 February in Valladolid, thus it stopped being called "Village", despite there being no explicit justification of the reasons for that change. 20 July 1444 the same king added the titles of "Very noble", and "Very loyal", which up until today appear in the seal of the city. In this case, the reason was the loyalty of the habitants against the homonymous king John II of Aragon, because despite the «long war, and wounds and deaths, and robberies, and fires, and damages and oppresions», the city remained loyal to the service of the king of Castile.

5 July 1523, the king Francis I granted it the three fleurs-de-lis for the shield of the city for its resistance during the French siege in 1521.

It also received by Royal Decree the title of "Excellence" 6 December 1854 from Isabella II, as a reward for its behavior during the cholera epidemic which devastated the city.

Geography
The Camino de Santiago passes through the city. The geographical coordinates of the city are: 42° 27′ N, 2° 29′ W.

History 

Logroño was an old settlement, first of the Romans, under the name of Vareia, a commercial port, and then of the Celts. From the 10th century, possession of Logroño was disputed between the kings of Navarre and those of Castile; the region was finally annexed to Castile. The name is a combination of le and Groin, mashed together as Logroño over time.  Alfonso VI of Castile granted Logroño in 1095 a charter of rights that served as a model for other Spanish cities. In 1609 and 1610 Logroño was the main seat of the Basque witch trials, part of the Spanish Inquisition.

Famous people from Logroño include Manuel Bretón de los Herreros, Fausto Elhúyar, Práxedes Mateo Sagasta, Rafael Azcona, Ramón Castroviejo, Pedro J. Ramírez, Navarrete "El Mudo".

Demographics

Population centres
 Logroño
 El Cortijo
 Varea

Politics

Economy

Logroño is the shopping and financial capital of La Rioja. Its economy is heavily reliant on wine, the most popular of which is Rioja D.O. Logroño is twinned with Dunfermline, Darmstadt, Libourne, Dax, Rancagua, Ciudad de La Rioja, Brescia, El Hagounia. The airport Logroño-Agoncillo connects the city with Madrid.

Food
There are over 50 taperías (tapas restaurants) located within a four-block area near the town center. The traditional tapas restaurants often serve only one tapa [such as seta (mushroom), served as pincho – pintxo in Basque – meaning one serving, or media ración ("half portion"), a small plate of tapas, but offer the Rioja D.O.

Climate

The weather in Logroño – mostly due to its peculiar location, both in terms of distance to the Atlantic coast and in the situation along the course of the Ebro river, is characterized by values ranging from those typically found in temperate oceanic climates to the warmer and drier ones observed in southeastern mediterranean regions of the river's valley. However, the weather station has a cold semi-arid climate (Köppen: BSk) with subtropical influences. The winds that affect the city are as follows: the northerly Cierzo, the southerly Ábrego, the easterly Solano, and the westerly Castellano. Intermediate winds are the northeasterly Navarrico, the northwesterly Regañón, the southwesterly Burgalés and the southeasterly Soriano.

Places of interest

 Con-Catedral de Santa María de la Redonda
 Iglesia (Church) de San Bartolomé
 Iglesia de Santiago
 Iglesia de Palacio
 Museo de La Rioja
 Parlamento de La Rioja, an old factory of the tabacalera, the national tobacco company.
 Muralla del Revellín
 Fuente (Fountain) de los Riojanos Ilustres, in which royal figures with a connection to either Logroño or La Rioja are represented in bronze. Because the figures are placed looking towards the public and so large torrents of water pour down behind them, the fountain is commonly known as the one with "wet backs".

Bridge of Mantible, in the El Cortijo district. Constructed during the Roman era and declared Bien de Interés Cultural in the Monument category on January 25, 1983.
Theatre of Bretón de los Herreros

Recreation (plazas and parks)

Paseo del Príncipe de Vergara (El Espolón): Located in the financial center of the capital and positioned in the center by the statue of General Espartero.
Plaza del Ayuntamiento: Located on the Avenue of Peace, the modern Town Hall of Logroño, designed by architect Rafael Moneo, is in a large plaza where in years past it has seen numerous public acts, festivals, expositions, concerts, and in the last few years, during Christmas, a life size reconstruction of the nativity scene.
Parque del Carmen: Located near the bus station, this park has a variety of flora and fauna including several ducks and birds.

Plaza del Mercado: Located somewhere near Calle Portales, one of the most famous avenues of the city, at the foot of the Round Cathedral. This is where the nightly festivals of Logroño occur, near Calle Mayor (Marqués de San Nicolas Street).
Parque del Ebro: Located near the Ebro, an extensive park full of vegetation ideal for relaxing. Also has a bike path traversing through the park.
Parque de la Ribera: Next to Parque del Ebro, recently constructed. Here many gardens are found alongside the Plaza de Toros de la Ribera. Also: Riojaforum. Palacio de Congresos y Auditorio de La Rioja
Parque de San Miguel

Social life
Calle del Laurel, known as "the path of the elephants" and Calle San Juan are typical streets where various restaurants and tapas bars offer some of the best pinchos and tapas in northern Spain. Calle Portales is the main street in the old town, where people like to walk and sit in the terraces to eat a meal or drink wine. Calle Marqués de San Nicolás (otherwise known as Calle Mayor) is the main area where people spend weekend nights.

Broadcasting stations
Southwest of Logroño, at 42°26'34"N   2°30'43"W, there is a mediumwave broadcasting station with a transmission power of 20 kW.

Sports
CB Ciudad de Logroño - handball-Liga ASOBAL - CB Ciudad de Logroño
Club Voleibol Logroño - volleyball-Superliga Femenina - Club Voleibol Logroño
EdF Logroño - women's football-Primera División - EdF Logroño
UD Logroñés - football-Primera Federación - UD Logroñés
SD Logroñés - football-Primera Federación - SD Logroñés
Yagüe CF - football-Tercera Federación

Triple jumper Carlota Castrejana is from the city. David Lopez Moreno, the Brighton & Hove Albion midfielder is from Logroño.

Festivals and traditions

The patron saint of Logroño is Santa María de la Esperanza.

The most important festivals are:
 San Bernabé (Saint Barnabas), celebrated on June 11, commemorating the victory and resistance of Logroño against French invaders under Francis I that besieged the city in May and June 1521. During this celebration, fried trout is typically served by the Fish Brotherhood, along with bread and wine, allegedly the only foodstuffs available in Logroño during the siege.
 San Mateo, celebrated between September 20 and September 26. Since 2006 the celebrations start the Saturday before September 21 (the day of Saint Matthew) and last for a week.

During the first week of January there is a cultural festival known as "ACTUAL" with music, theater and art.

International relations

Twin towns and sister cities
Logroño is twinned with:
 Brescia, Italy
 Darmstadt, Germany (since 2002)
 Dax, France (since 1960)
 Dunfermline, Fife, Scotland. (since 1990)
El Hagounia, Western Sahara (since 1991)
 Libourne, France (since 1979)
 Rancagua, Chile (since 1992) 
 Ciudad de La Rioja, Argentina (since 1992)

Logroño is associated with:

 Vichy, France (since 1965)
 Wilhelmshaven, Germany (since 1990)

Transport 
The city is served by the Logroño railway station.

In popular culture
In the 4th season of the HBO television series True Blood, the witch Antonia is from Logroño. She refers to herself as Antonia Galván de Logroño.
In the Netflix original series Money Heist, where members of the band of bank robbers use cities as codenames, their accomplice Benjamín Martínez is jokingly given the codename 'Logroño'.

Notable people 
Some notable people from Logroño are:

Juan Fernández de Navarrete, (1526-1579), Mannerist painter.
Rodrigo de Arriaga, (1592-1667) philosopher, theologian and Jesuit.
Maria de Arburu, (died in Logrono, 1610) as an alleged witch
Fausto Elhuyar, (1755-1833) and Juan José Elhuyar (1754-1796) chemists and discoverers of tungsten.
Martín Zurbano, (1788-1845) liberal military figure.
Baldomero Espartero, (1793-1879) general and liberal politician.
Cosme García Sáez, (1818-1874) engineer, first to invent a submersible.
Ildefonso Zubía, (1819-1891) pharmacist and botanist.
Julio Rey Pastor, (1888-1962) mathematician.
María Teresa León, (1903-1988) writer of the Generation of '27.
Ramón Castroviejo, (1904-1987) eye surgeon.
María Teresa Gil de Gárate, (1906-1985) educator.
Gerardo Sacristán, (1907-1964) painter.
Pepe Blanco, (1911-1981) singer and actor.
Enrique Blanco Lac, (1914-1994) painter.
Manuel Jalón, (1925-2011) engineer and inventor.
Rafael Azcona, (1926-2008) screenwriter and novelist.
Soledad Bravo, (1943-) Venezuelan singer of Spanish origin.
Jesús Vicente Aguirre, (1948-) singer-songwriter and writer.
Pedro J. Ramírez, (1952-) journalist and editor of El Español.
Luis Burgos, (1957-) representational painter.
Gaspar Llamazares, (1957-) doctor and politician of Izquierda Abierta.
Angela Muro, (1962-) actress, singer and componist.
Pepe Viyuela, (1963-) actor and comedian.
Eduardo Sáenz de Cabezón, (1972-) mathematician and science communicator.
Pablo Sainz Villegas, (1977-) classical guitarist.
Daniel Aranzubía, (1979-) former football player.
Carlos Coloma Nicolás, (1981-) cross-country mountain biker.
Pau Quemada, (1983-) field hockey player.
Alberto Garzón, (1985-) economist and politician of United Left.*

Gallery

References

External links

Official website 
University of La Rioja 
Bermemar 
Mayors of Logroño 
Fish Brotherhood 
Lorono Travel Information 

 
Municipalities in La Rioja (Spain)